Chirens is a commune in the Isère département in southeastern France.

Above the hamlet of Clermont stands the Tour de Clermont, the only remains of the former castle of the Counts of Clermont-Tonnerre.

Population

See also
Communes of the Isère department

References

External links

Official site

Communes of Isère